Scleropages is a genus of fish in the family Osteoglossidae found in Asia and Australia. All of these species are carnivorous and have great jumping ability. These species are highly valued as aquarium fish, particularly by those from Asian cultures. In 2003, a study redescribed several naturally occurring color varieties of S. formosus into four separate species. The majority of researchers dispute these redescriptions, arguing that the published data are insufficient to justify recognizing more than one Southeast Asian species of Scleropages and that divergent haplotypes used to distinguish the color strains into isolated species were found within a single color strain, contradicting the findings. They are considered monotypic, consisting of closely related haplotypes based on color.
The ancestor of the Australian arowanas: S. jardinii and S. leichardti, diverged from the ancestor of the Asian arowanas about 140 million years ago, during the Early Cretaceous period. The morphological similarity of all seven species shows that little evolutionary change has taken place recently for these ancient fish. The genus had a much wider distribution during the early Cenozoic, with fossil remains known from the Paleocene of Niger and Belgium, and from the Eocene of China.

Species
There are currently 4 recognized species in this genus:

Phylogeny
Phylogeny based on the work of Pouyaud, Sudarto & Teugels 2003.

References

 
Freshwater fish genera
Taxa named by Albert Günther